Little Nicobar (Nicobarese: Ong) is one of the Nicobar Islands, India.

History
The 2004 Indian Ocean earthquake and tsunami caused extensive damage to this island.

Geography
There are a few smaller islands off of Little Nicobar's shores: Menchal, Pulomilo, Treis/Albatei, Trak/Mafuya and Meroe. 

Demographics 
According to the 2011 census of India, Little Nicobar Island had 278 villagers in 59 households. The effective literacy rate (the literacy rate of population excluding children aged 6 and below) was 100%.
Pulopanja, Pulobaha, Pulloullo, and Makhahu (Victoria Harbour) are the main villages on the island.

Administration
The island belongs to the township of Great Nicobar of Little Nicobar Taluk.

Image gallery

References 

Islands of the Andaman and Nicobar Islands
Tehsils of the Andaman and Nicobar Islands
Nicobar district